Morina is a genus of moth in the family Geometridae.

References
Natural History Museum Lepidoptera genus database

Geometridae
Geometridae genera